Boriskino is a rural locality (a village) in Yengalyshevsky Selsoviet, Chishminsky District, Bashkortostan, Russia. The population was 101 as of 2010. There are 4 streets.

Geography 
Boriskino is located 43 km southeast of Chishmy (the district's administrative centre) by road. Vyazovka is the nearest rural locality.

References 

Rural localities in Chishminsky District